Geir Bakke (born 23 October 1969) is a Norwegian football coach and former player. He is currently the manager of Eliteserien club Lillestrøm.

Geir Bakke was born at Hamar, where he spent his infant years, before his family relocated to Rælingen when he was six.

Playing career
Geir Bakke started his playing career at local club Rælingen before switching to nearby Strømmen in 1987 at 18 years of age. Having made two appearances in the top division with Strømmen in 1988, the following seasons at the club was spent outside the top flight. Ahead of the 1993-season, he transferred to Kongsvinger with whom he spent two seasons playing mostly at right-back in Eliteserien. Ambitious, newly promoted Stabæk signed him ahead of the 1995-season. He would spend three seasons at Stabæk. He was a regular at right-back during his first season at Stabæk, and played fifteen games in his second season. A troublesome knee prevented him from playing any games in his third and final season at the club.

Managerial career
Upon retiring as a player, he then pursued a managerial career, having been educated at Norges idrettshøyskole and worked several years coaching young players at Wang Toppidrett. He was hired to coach Skjetten in 1998 and 1999.

Vålerenga
Bakke was assistant coach in Vålerenga from 1999 to 2005. He was assistant under Tom Nordlie in his first two seasons at the club. From 2001 to 2005 he was assistant under Kjetil Rekdal. Vålerenga won Tippeligaen, the Norwegian top flight, in 2005. Bakke quit his position in Vålerenga after the 2005 season to become head coach in Moss FK.

Moss
As announced on 30 October 2005, he took over second tier club Moss effecting from the start of the 2006 season. This was Bakke's first job as a head coach for a professional football team. Moss finished fifth in the 2007 1. divisjon. Bakke resigned on 28 August 2008.

Stabæk
Geir Bakke was presented as assistant coach in Stabæk on 29 August 2008, the day after his resignation in Moss. He replaced Petter Belsvik and signed a three-year contract with the club. On 10 November 2011 it was announced that Bakke was leaving Stabæk to become head coach in Kristiansund BK.

Kristiansund
Bakke was head coach at Kristiansund for two seasons, from 2012 to 2013. Kristiansund won 2. divisjon Group 2 in Bakke's first season and were promoted to the 2013 1. divisjon. The 2013 season was the first season in club history that Kristiansund played at the second highest level in Norwegian football.

Molde
On 17 January 2014, Bakke was presented as the new assistant coach at Molde FK. His partnership with head coach Tor Ole Skullerud turned out successfully, and Molde won the league title with 71 points (as of 2018 a league record). On 23 October 2014, it was announced that Geir Bakke was leaving Molde after the 2014 season to become head coach in Sarpsborg 08.

Sarpsborg 08
On 23 October 2014, Bakke was announced as head coach of Sarpborg 08. He signed a four-year deal with the club, effective 1 January 2015. He led the team to their first ever Norwegian Cup final in 2015, which they lost to Rosenborg with the score 0–2. In the 2017 season, Sarpsborg 08 finished third in Eliteserien. The third-place finish secured their first league medal in club history and qualified the club for European football for the first time. On 10 May 2017, Bakke signed a new five-year deal, which would have made him Sarpsborg 08's head coach until the end of the 2022 season. Instead Bakke left for then 1. division side Lillestrøm in 2019.

Lillestrøm
On 31 of December 2019, Geir Bakke was announced as the new head coach of Lillestrøm SK,  which found themselves in the 1. division of Norwegian football. The following season, 2020, Bakke led the team to promotion back to the Eliteserien.

Managerial statistics

Honours

As a head coach
Kristiansund
2. divisjon, group 2: 2012

Sarpsborg 08
Eliteserien: Bronze 2017
Norwegian Football Cup: Runners-up 2015, 2017

Awards
Norwegian Football Coaches Association: Coach of the year in 2017

References

External links
Biography at Sarpsborg08.com

1969 births
Living people
Norwegian footballers
Strømmen IF players
Stabæk Fotball players
Kongsvinger IL Toppfotball players
Eliteserien players
Norwegian football managers
Vålerenga Fotball non-playing staff
Moss FK managers
Stabæk Fotball non-playing staff
Kristiansund BK managers
Molde FK non-playing staff
Sarpsborg 08 FF managers
Lillestrøm SK managers
Eliteserien managers
Association football defenders
Sportspeople from Hamar